Masalsky is a rural locality (a settlement) in and the administrative center of Masalsky Selsoviet, Loktevsky District, Altai Krai, Russia. The population was 1,669 as of 2013. There are 22 streets.

Geography 
Masalsky  is located 30 km east of Gornyak (the district's administrative centre) by road. Stepnoy is the nearest rural locality.

References 

Rural localities in Loktevsky District